Kandep is the district headquarters of Kandep District in the southern Enga Province of Papua New Guinea. It is a rural station located in the southern part of the district, and is administered by Kandep Rural LLG.

Flights
The old Kandep District Airport  is located in the heart of Kandep.

Safety
Warring tribes and factions have made travel along the roads dangerous, with hold-ups becoming all to common.

References

Populated places in Enga Province